Yazdagird (Persian: یزدگرد) was the ruler of the Bavand dynasty from 1271 to 1298. He was the cousin and successor of Ali of Tabaristan.

Biography 

Yazdagird was the son of Shahriyar, who was the brother of the Bavand king Ardashir II of Tabaristan. During the reign of Yazdagird, his overlord, the Ilkhanate, were in a civil war. During this period, Yazdagird's kingdom experienced a period of relative prosperity and security. He is also known for building several madrassas in his capital, Amol. Yazdagird died in 1298, and was succeeded by his son Shahriyar V.

Sources
 

14th-century Bavandid rulers
13th-century Bavandid rulers
1300 deaths
Year of birth unknown